Llanbradach railway station is a railway station serving the village of Llanbradach, south Wales. It is a stop on the Rhymney Line of the Valley Lines network.

History
The railway line through here opened in 1858. Llanbradach station was opened on 1 March 1893 by the Rhymney Railway, replacing Pwllypant (Bradshaw's spelling) a short way to the south.

Services
In the evening, the service reduces to hourly each way and on Sundays to two-hourly (when southbound trains run to  rather than Penarth).

References

External links

Railway stations in Caerphilly County Borough
DfT Category F2 stations
Former Rhymney Railway stations
Railway stations in Great Britain opened in 1858
Railway stations served by Transport for Wales Rail